The Lefty O'Doul Bridge (also known as the Third Street Bridge or China Basin Bridge) is a bascule bridge connecting the China Basin and Mission Bay neighborhoods of San Francisco, carrying Third Street across the Mission Creek Channel. It is located directly adjacent to Oracle Park.

History
The bridge opened on May 12, 1933, at a ceremony attended by mayor Angelo Joseph Rossi, having been designed by Joseph Strauss, chief engineer of the Golden Gate Bridge. At the time, it carried pedestrians, automobiles, streetcars, and trains. The bridge was renamed in 1980 in honor of baseball player Lefty O'Doul. It was retrofitted in 1999, prior to the opening of the adjacent ballpark, originally named Pacific Bell Park.

Usage
The bridge carries five lanes of traffic. During normal conditions, the two easternmost lanes carry northbound traffic, the two westernmost lanes carry southbound traffic, and the center lane is reversible. Before, during, and after events at neighboring Oracle Park, the two easternmost lanes are closed to vehicles and used exclusively by pedestrians, while the remaining two easternmost lanes are reversible.

References

Further reading

External links

Bridges in San Francisco
Bascule bridges in the United States
Bridges completed in 1933
San Francisco Designated Landmarks
San Francisco Bay Trail